Alejandro Fernández Vázquez (born 4 April 1980 in Langreo, Asturias), known as Jano, is a Spanish former professional footballer who played as a defender.

External links

1980 births
Living people
People from Langreo
Spanish footballers
Footballers from Asturias
Association football defenders
Segunda División players
Segunda División B players
Tercera División players
Sporting de Gijón B players
Sporting de Gijón players
Real Avilés CF footballers
CD Badajoz players
Burgos CF footballers
Écija Balompié players
SD Ponferradina players
UD Logroñés players
Caudal Deportivo footballers